Peer Kluge (born 22 November 1980) is a German former professional footballer who played as a midfielder.

Career
Kluge played for Chemnitzer FC, Borussia Mönchengladbach, 1. FC Nürnberg and Schalke 04 before signing for Hertha BSC.

Career statistics

Honours

Club
Schalke 04
 DFB-Pokal: 2010–11
 DFL-Supercup: 2011

References

External links
 
 

1980 births
Living people
People from Frankenberg, Saxony
German footballers
Germany B international footballers
Association football midfielders
Chemnitzer FC players
Borussia Mönchengladbach players
1. FC Nürnberg players
FC Schalke 04 players
Hertha BSC players
Arminia Bielefeld players
Bundesliga players
2. Bundesliga players
3. Liga players
Footballers from Saxony